Cuvier Island Lighthouse is a lighthouse on Cuvier Island, a small island off the east coast of the North Island of New Zealand. It is owned and operated by Maritime New Zealand.

History 
The light was constructed in 1889 and was the first lighthouse built in New Zealand using cast iron. The light was fully automated in 1982 and is controlled from the Maritime New Zealand headquarters in Wellington. Cuvier Island itself is a wildlife reserve which is managed by the Department of Conservation and is part of an island restoration project.

See also 

 List of lighthouses in New Zealand

References

External links 
 
 Lighthouses of New Zealand Maritime New Zealand
 Picture of Cuvier Island Lighthouse The Lighthouse Directory

Lighthouses completed in 1889
Lighthouses in New Zealand
Geography of Waikato
Transport buildings and structures in Waikato